The Codex Alexandrinus (London, British Library, Royal MS 1. D. V-VIII), designated by the siglum A or 02 (in the Gregory-Aland numbering of New Testament manuscripts), δ 4 (in the von Soden numbering of New Testament manuscripts), is a manuscript of the Greek Bible, written on parchment. Using the study of comparative writing styles (palaeography), it has been dated to the fifth century. It contains the majority of the Greek Old Testament and the Greek New Testament. It is one of the four Great uncial codices (these being manuscripts which originally contained the whole of both the Old and New Testaments). Along with Codex Sinaiticus and Vaticanus, it is one of the earliest and most complete manuscripts of the Bible. 

It derives its name from the city of Alexandria (in Egypt), where it resided for a number of years before it was brought by the Eastern Orthodox Patriarch Cyril Lucaris from Alexandria to Constantinople (modern day Istanbul in Turkey). Then it was given to Charles I of England in the 17th century. Bishop Brian Walton assigned Alexandrinus the capital Latin letter A in the Polyglot Bible (a multi-language version of the Bible with the different languages placed in parallel columns) of 1657. This designation was maintained when the New Testament manuscript list system was standardized by Swiss theologian and textual critic J. J. Wettstein in 1751. Thus Alexandrinus held the first position in the manuscript list. 

Until the later purchase of Codex Sinaiticus, biblical scholar and textual critic Frederick H. A. Scrivener described it as the best manuscript of the Greek Bible deposited in Britain. Today, it rests along with Codex Sinaiticus in one of the showcases in the Sir John Ritblat Gallery of the British Library in London, U.K. A full photographic reproduction of the New Testament volume (Royal MS 1 D. viii) is available on the British Library's website.

Description

Most of the folios were originally gathered into quires of eight leaves each (this being eight parchment leaves placed on top of each other, then folded as per quarto above). In modern times it was rebound into sets of six leaves each. The pages are often discoloured at the edges, which have been damaged by age and more so through the ignorance or carelessness of the modern binder, who has not always spared the text, especially at the upper inner margin. Scrivener noted that "The vellum has fallen into holes in many places, and since the ink peels off for every age whensoever a leaf is touched a little roughly, no one is allowed to handle the manuscript except for good reasons." Three volumes contain the Septuagint (the Greek version of the Old Testament, also known as the LXX), with ten leaves lost. The fourth volume contains the New Testament with 31 leaves lost. In the fourth volume, 1 and 2 Clement are also missing leaves, perhaps 3.

The text in the codex is written in two columns in uncial script, with between 49 and 51 lines per column, and 20 to 25 letters per line. The beginning lines of each book are written in red ink, and sections within the book are marked by a larger letter set into the margin. The text is written continuously, with no division of words (known as Scriptio continua), but some pauses are observed in places in which a dot should be between two words. There are no accents or breathing marks, except a few added by a later hand. The punctuation was written by the first hand. The poetical books of the Old Testament are written stichometrically (this being a new verse/phrase starting on a new line). The Old Testament quotations in the text of New Testament are marked in the margin by the sign 〉(known as a diplai).

The only decorations in the codex are tail-pieces at the end of each book (see illustration), and it also shows a tendency to increase the size of the first letter of each sentence. The larger letters at the beginning of the sections stand out in the margin as in codices Ephraemi and Basilensis. Codex Alexandrinus is the oldest manuscript to use larger letters to indicate new sections.

iotacistic errors occur in the text: αὶ is exchanged for ε, εὶ for ὶ and η for ὶ. This is, however, no more than seen in other manuscripts of the same date. This may be an argument which points to Egypt as where the codex was produced, but it is not universally accepted.

The handwriting of the text from the beginning of Luke to 1 Corinthians 10:8 differs from that of the rest parts of the manuscript. Some letters have Coptic shapes (f.e. Α (alpha), Μ (mu), Δ (delta), and Π (pi)). The letters are more widely spaced and are a little larger than elsewhere. Δ has extended base and Π has extended cross-stroke. Numerals are not expressed by letters except in Revelation 7:4; 21:17. In the past the codex had been judged to have been carelessly written, with many errors of transcription, but not so many as in Codex Sinaiticus, and no more than Codex Vaticanus.

The majuscule letters have elegant shape, but a little less simple than those in Codex Sinaiticus and Codex Vaticanus. At the end of a line, these letters are often very small, and much of the writing is very pale and faint. Punctuation is more frequent, usually on a level with the top of the preceding letter, while a vacant space, proportionate to the break in the sense, follows the end of a paragraph. At the end of each book the colophon is ornamented by pretty volutes from the initial copyist. The Ammonian Sections with references to the Eusebian Canons (an early system of dividing the four Gospels into different sections, developed by early church writer Eusebius of Caesarea) stand in the margin of the Gospels. It contains divisions into larger sections ( (kephalaia), or chapters), the headings of these sections ( / titloi) stand at the top of the pages. The places at which sections start are indicated throughout the Gospels, and in Luke and John their numbers are placed in the margin of each column. To all the Gospels (except Matthew, due to several pages missing at the beginning) is prefixed by a table of κεφάλαια / kephalaia (table of contents).

The various Euthalian Apparatus sections into which the Acts, Epistles, and Apocalypse were divided (similar to Eusebius' system for the Gospels) are not indicated in this manuscript. A cross appears occasionally as a separation in the Book of Acts. A larger letter in the margin throughout the New Testament marks the beginning of a paragraph.

The number of scribes who worked on the codex have been disputed. According to biblical and classical scholar Frederic Kenyon's opinion there were five scribes, two scribes in the Old Testament (I and II) and three in the New (III, IV, and V). Subsequently, textual critics Theodore Skeat and Milne argued there were only two or possibly three scribes. 20th-21st century scholars agreed in that case (such as biblical scholar and textual critic Bruce Metzger, biblical scholar and textual critic Kurt Aland, textual critic Juan Hernández Jr., and textual critic Dirk Jongkind).

Many corrections have been made to the manuscript, some of them by the original scribe, but the majority of them by later hands. The corrected form of the text agrees with codices D, N, X, Y, Γ, Θ, Π, Σ, Φ and the majority of minuscule manuscripts. Kenyon observed that Codex Alexandrinus had been "extensively corrected, though much more in some books than in others". In the Pentateuch, whole sentences were erased and a new text substituted. Kings was the least corrected of the books. In the Book of Revelation only 1 of its 84 singular readings was corrected, the rest remained uncorrected. This is in stark contrast with Codex Sinaiticus, in which 120 of the Apocalypse's 201 singular readings were corrected in the 7th century.

Each leaf has Arabic numeration, set in the verso of the lower margin. The first surviving leaf of Matthew has number 26. The 25 leaves now lost must have been extant when that note was written.

Contents

The codex contains a nearly complete copy of the LXX, including the deuterocanonical books (those books not accepted as authoritative by some Christians, but accepted by certain Christian denominations) 3 and 4 Maccabees, Psalm 151 and the 14 Odes. The Epistle to Marcellinus (attributed to Saint Athanasius) and the Eusebian summary of the Psalms are inserted before the Book of Psalms (an overview of the Psalms written by the early Christian writer Eusebius of Caesarea). It also contains all of the books of the New Testament, however the pages containing Matthew 1:1–25:5 are not extant. The codex also contains 1 Clement (lacking 57:7–63; this is a letter attributed to the early Christian writer Clement of Rome) and the homily known as 2 Clement (up to 12:5a; another letter attributed to Clement of Rome). The books of the Old Testament are thus distributed: Genesis – 2 Chronicles (first volume), Hosea – 4 Maccabees (second volume), Psalms – Sirach (third volume). The New Testament (fourth volume) books are in the order: Gospels, Acts of the Apostles, General epistles, Pauline epistles (Hebrews placed between 2 Thessalonians and 1 Timothy), Book of Revelation.

There is an appendix marked in the index, which lists the Psalms of Solomon and probably contained more apocryphal/pseudepigraphical books (books written which have been attributed to certain famous people mentioned in the Bible, but likely of unknown authorship), but it has been torn off and the pages containing these books have also been lost.

Due to damage and lost folios, various passages are missing or have defects:
 Lacking: 1 Sam 12:17–14:9 (1 leaf); Ps 49:20–79:11 (9 leaves); Matt 1:1-25:6 (26 leaves); John 6:50-8:52 (2 leaves); 2 Cor 4:13-12:6 (3 leaves); 1 Clement 57:7-63 (1 leaf) and 2 Clement 12:5a-fin. (2 leaves);
 Damaged: Gen 14:14–17, 15:1–5, 15:16–19, 16:6–9 (lower portion of torn leaf lost);
 Defects due to torn leaves: Genesis 1:20–25, 1:29–2:3, Lev 8:6,7,16; Sirach 50:21f, 51:5;
 Lacunae on the edges of almost every page of the Apocalypse.
 The ornamented colophon of the Epistle to Philemon has been cut out.

Textual features

Textual critics have had a challenging task in classifying the text of the codex, specifically when it comes to the New Testament; the exact relationship to other text-types and manuscript families is still disputed, and as such the Greek text of the codex is considered to be of mixed text-types. The text-types are groups of different New Testament manuscripts which share specific or generally related readings, which then differ from each other group, and thus the conflicting readings can separate out the groups. These are then used to determine the original text as published; there are three main groups with names: Alexandrian, Western, and Byzantine. The codex is a representative of the Byzantine text-type in the Gospels (the text-type's oldest example), and the rest of the New Testament books are of the Alexandrian text-type, with some Western readings. As the text in the codex is believed to have come from several different traditions, different parts of the codex are not of equal textual value. Aland placed it in Category III in the Gospels, and in Category I in rest of the books of the New Testament according to his manuscript text classification system. Category III manuscripts are described as having "a small but not a negligible proportion of early readings, with a considerable encroachment of [Byzantine] readings, and significant readings from other sources as  yet unidentified"; Category I manuscripts are depicted as featuring "a very high proportion of the early text, presumably the original text, which has not been preserved in its purity in any one manuscript." 
Text of the Gospels
The Byzantine text of the Gospels has a number of Alexandrian features, with some affinities to the textual Family Π. Biblical scholar and textual critic Hermann von Soden associated the text of the gospels with Family Π, though it is not a pure member of this family. According to biblical scholar and textual critic Burnett Streeter, it is the earliest Greek manuscript which gives us approximately the text of Lucian the Martyr (who is believed to have created a critical recension of both the Old and New Testaments), but a small proportion of the readings seem to be earlier.
 Text of the rest of the codex
Alexandrinus follows the Alexandrian readings through the rest of the New Testament; however, the text goes from closely resembling Codex Sinaiticus in the Pauline epistles to more closely resembling the text of a number of papyri ( for Acts,  for the Apocalypse). The text of Acts frequently agrees with the biblical quotations made by the 4th century Christian writer Athanasius of Alexandria. In the Pauline Epistles its text is closer to Codex Sinaiticus than to Codex Vaticanus. In the General Epistles it represents a different subtype than Codex Sinaiticus and Codex Vaticanus. According to Metzger, in Revelation and in several books of the Old Testament it has the best text of all manuscripts. In the Old Testament its text often agrees with Codex Sinaiticus.

Some Textual Variants

Old Testament

 (187 years) – A
 (167 years) – B

 (in a pillar) – A
 (in a cloud) – B

 (took) – A
 (struck) – B

 (maroon) – A
 (mud) – B

 – A
 – B

 (9:22 LXX)
 – A
 – B

 (work) – A
 (pain) – B

New Testament

Mark 16:9–20
incl. – A C D K W Γ Δ Θ ƒ 28 33 565 700 892 1241 1424 ℓ 844 ℓ 2211 Byz
omit –  B k sy arm

 (opened) – A B L W Ξ 33 892 1195 1241 ℓ 547  sa bo
 (unrolled) –  D K Δ Θ Π Ψ ƒ ƒ 28 565 700 1009 1010 Byz

 (about the sixth hour) – A
 (about the tenth hour) – Majority of manuscripts

 (the Holy Spirit fell on the eunuch, and an angel of the Lord caught up Philip) – A 94 103 307 322 323 385 453 467 945 1739 1765 1891 2298 2818 p vg syr
 (spirit of the Lord) – majority of manuscripts

 (Greeks) – A   D
 (Evangelists) – *
 (Hellenists) – Majority of manuscripts

 – A 
 –  B C Ψ 33 81 323 1175 1505 co; Eus
 – Majority of manuscripts

Acts 20:28
 (of the Lord) – A  C* D E Ψ 33 36 453 945 1739 1891
 (of God) –  B 614 1175 1505 vg sy bo

 (reward) – A (singular reading)
 (revelation) – Majority of manuscripts

 – A D Ψ 81 629 2127 vg
 – * B D* G 1739 1881 d g sa bo eth
 – Majority of manuscripts

 (mystery) – A  * C 88 436 a r sy bo
 (witness) – Majority of manuscripts

 (prayer) – A   * B C  G P Ψ 33 81 104 181 630 1962 it vg sa bo arm eth
 (fasting and prayer) – Majority of manuscripts

 – A 365 bo
 – Majority of manuscripts

 (of the devil) – A (singular reading)
 (of deceit) – Majority of manuscripts

1 Timothy 3:16
 (who was manifested) – A* * C* G 33 365 442 2127 ℓ 599
 (God was manifested) – A²  C² D K L P Ψ 81 330 630 1241 1739 Byz 

 (every good work and word) – A (singular reading)
 (every good work)- Majority of manuscripts

 (through water and blood and spirit) – A  104 424 614 1739 2412 2495 ℓ 598 sy sa bo; Origen
 (through water and blood) – Majority of manuscripts 
New Testament scholar and textual critic Ehrman identified it as Orthodox corrupt reading.

 (firstborn) – A (singular reading)
 (the first) – Majority of manuscripts

 (redeemed to God) – A eth
 (redeemed us to God) – All other manuscripts containing this verse -

Non-included Verses

omit – A  B C D Ψ Lect d k sy sa bo
incl. – Majority of manuscripts

 (Christ's agony at Gethsemane)
omit – A  * B T W 579 1071 ℓ 844 f sy sa bo
incl. – Majority of manuscripts

incl. – E 323 453 945 1739 1891 2818
omit – A Majority of manuscripts

incl. –  C 33 D* 323 453 614 sy sa bo
omit – A   B E L Ψ 81 Majority of manuscripts

omit – A   B L P 049 81 1175 1241 p* s vg co
incl. – E Ψ 33 323 614 945 1505 1739 2464 gig sy

omit – A   B E Ψ 048 33 81 1175 1739 2464 s sy co
incl. – Majority of manuscripts

omit – A    B C 81 1739 2464 b co
incl. – Majority of manuscripts

Alexandrinus is an important witness for the absence of Pericope Adultera (John 7:53–8:11). Gregory asserted in regard to the lost two leaves (John 6:50–8:52), "For by counting the lines we can prove that it was not in the book. There was not room for it". A similar counting involving missing leaves is done with Codex Ephraemi.

History

Place of origin 
The codex's original provenance is unknown. Cyril Lucaris was the first to suggest Alexandria as its place of origin, which has been the traditional view and is the most probable hypothesis. This popular view is based on an Arabic note on folio 1 (from the 13th or 14th century), which reads: "Bound to the Patriarchal Cell in the Fortress of Alexandria. Whoever removes it thence shall be excommunicated and cut off. Written by Athanasius the humble." "Athanasius the humble" is identified with Athanasius III, Patriarch of Alexandria from 1276 to 1316.

F. C. Burkitt questioned this popular view. According to Burkitt, the note reads: "Bound to the Patriarchal Cell in the Fortress of Alexandria. He that lets it go out shall be cursed and ruined. The humble Athanasius wrote (this)." The codex had been found on Mount Athos, and might have been taken to Egypt by Cyril in 1616, and so all the Arabic writing in the codex could have been inserted between that date and 1621, when Cyril was elected Ecumenical Patriarch of Constantinople. On this supposition "Athanasius the humble" might have been "some person of Cyril's staff who had charge of his library". According to Burkitt's view the codex was found on Athos, but it was written in Constantinople, because it represents a Constantinopolitan text (now known as the Byzantine text). This hypothesis was supported by Kirsopp Lake.

Frederic G. Kenyon opposed Burkit's view, and argued Cyril firmly believed in the Egyptian origin of the codex. In 1938 A. S. Fulton, the Keeper of the Department of Oriental Printed Books and Manuscripts in the British Museum, re-examined the Athanasius note, and based on palaeographical grounds his opinion was it could be dated to the 13th or 14th century, and the 17th century was excluded. In 1945 T. D. Moschonas published a catalogue of the library of the Patriarch of Alexandria, in which he printed two Greek notes, both from 10th-century manuscripts of John Chrysostom, inserted by the Patriarch Athanasius III. The two notes must have been written between 1308 and 1316. Although the note in the Codex Alexandrinus is entirely in Arabic, and therefore no identity of hand with the Greek notes can be expected, the similarity of wording leaves no doubt that this is also the work of Athanasius III.

Burnett Hillman Streeter proposed Caesarea or Beirut for three reasons: 1) after the New Testament it contains the two Epistles of Clement; 2) it represents an eclectic text in the New Testament (Antiochian in the Gospels and Alexandrian in the Acts and Epistles), suggesting some place where the influence of Antioch and of Alexandria met; 3) the text of the Old Testament appears to be a non-Alexandrian text heavily revised by the Hexapla, as the Old Testament quotations in the New Testament portion more often agree with Alexandrinus against Vaticanus than not.

According to Skeat the note in the codex indicated the codex had not previously been in the Patriarchal Library in Alexandria. The codex was carried from Constantinople to Alexandria between 1308 and 1316, together with two manuscripts of Chrysostom. It remained in Alexandria until 1621, when Cyril removed it to Constantinople. Whether it was originally written in Constantinople or in Alexandria, is another question. Skeat did not try to give the answer on this question ("if any future scholar wishes to claim a Constantinopolitan origin for the Codex Alexandrinus, it is at least open to him to do so"). This view was supported by McKendrick, who proposes an Ephesian provenance for the codex.

A 17th-century Latin note on a flyleaf (from the binding in a royal library) states the codex was given to a patriarchate of Alexandria in 1098 (donum dedit cubicuo Patriarchali anno 814 Martyrum), although this may well be "merely an inaccurate attempt at deciphering the Arabic note by Athanasius" (possibly the patriarch Athanasius III). The authority for this statement is unknown.

Date
According to an Arabic note on the reverse of the first volume of the manuscript, the manuscript was written by the hand of Thecla, the martyr, a notable lady of Egypt, a little later than the Council of Nicaea (A.D. 325).  Tregelles made another suggestion, the New Testament volume has long been mutilated, and begins now in the twenty-fifth chapter of Matthew, in which chapter the lesson for Thecla's Day stands. "We cannot be sure how the story arose. It may be that the manuscript was written in a monastery dedicated to Thecla." Tregelles thought that Thecla's name might have on this account been written in the margin above, which has been cut off, and that therefore the Egyptians imagined that Thecla had written it. Cyril Lucaris believed in Thecla's authorship, but the codex cannot be older than from late 4th century.

Codex Alexandrinus contains the Epistle of Athanasius on the Psalms to Marcellinus, so it cannot be considered earlier than A.D. 373 (terminus post quem). In the Acts and Epistles we cannot find such chapter divisions, whose authorship is ascribed to Euthalius, Bishop of Sulci, come into vogue before the middle of the fifth century. It is terminus ad quem. The presence of Epistle of Clement, which was once read in Churches recalls to a period when the canon of Scripture was in some particulars not quite settled. It is certain that the writing of the manuscript appears to be somewhat more advanced than that of the Vaticanus or Sinaiticus, especially in the enlargement of initial letters. It is also more decorated, though its ornamentations are already found in earlier manuscripts.

Codex Alexandrinus was written a generation after codices Sinaiticus and Vaticanus, but it may still belong to the fourth century. It cannot be later than the beginning of the fifth. It is currently dated by the INTF to the 5th century.

In Britain

The codex was brought to Constantinople in 1621 by Cyril Lucaris (a patriarch of Alexandria first, then later a patriarch of Constantinople). Lucaris was involved in a complex struggle with the Turkish government, the Catholic Church, and his own subordinates. He was supported by the English government, and presented the codex to James I in 1624, as gratitude for his help. The codex was presented through the hands of Thomas Roe (together with minuscule 49), the English ambassador at the court of the Sultan. King James I died before the codex was sent to England, and the offer was transferred to Charles I in 1627. It was saved from the fire at Ashburnham House (the Cotton library) on 23 October 1731, by the librarian, Richard Bentley. It became a part of the Royal Library at the British Museum, and since 1973 has been in the British Library.

Collations and editions

The text of the Epistles of Clement from the codex was published in 1633 by Patrick Young, the Royal Librarian. A collation was made by Alexander Huish, Prebendary of Wells, for the London Polyglot Bible (1657). The text of the codex was cited in footnotes. Richard Bentley made a collation in 1675.

The Old Testament was edited by Ernst Grabe in 1707–1720, and the New Testament by Carl Gottfried Woide in 1786, in facsimile from wooden type, line for line, without spaces between the words, exactly mimicking the original. For the text in 1 Tim 3:16, the facsimile has  , and Woide in his prolegomenon combats the opinion of Wettstein, who maintained that   was the original reading, and that the stroke, which in some lights can be seen across part of the Ο, arose from the middle-stroke part of a letter Ε being visible through the vellum. Wettstein's assertion was also disputed by F.H. Scrivener, who found that "Ε cut the Ο indeed . . . but cut it too high to have been reasonably mistaken by a careful observer for the diameter of Θ." Tregelles however agrees with Wettstein's reading of the codex, and states "as the result of repeated examinations, we can say distinctly that Woide was wrong, and Wetstein was right."

Woide's edition contained some typesetting errors, such as in the Epistle to Ephesians –  (4:1) and πραόθητος for πραότητος (4:2). These errors were corrected in 1860 by B. H. Cowper, and E. H. Hansell, with three other manuscripts, in 1860. The Old Testament portion was also published in three folio volumes by Baber in 1816–1828. In 1879 and 1880, the entire codex was issued in photographic facsimile by the British Museum, under the supervision of E. M. Thompson. Frederic G. Kenyon edited a photographic facsimile of the New Testament with reduced size in 1909. The text of the Old Testament followed four parts in 1915.

Textual criticism

According to Bentley the codex is "the oldest and best in the world". Bentley assumed that by supplementing this manuscript with readings from other manuscripts and from the Latin Vulgate, he could triangulate back to the single recension which he presumed existed at the time of the First Council of Nicaea. Wettstein highly esteemed the codex in 1730, but changed his opinion in 1751 and was no longer a great admirer of it. He came to the conviction that Athos was the place of its origin, not Alexandria. Michaelis also did not esteem it highly, either on account of its internal excellence or the value of its readings. The principal charge which has been produced against the manuscript, and which had been urged by Wettstein, was it had been altered from the Latin version. Michaelis countered that the transcriber who lived in Egypt would not have altered the Greek text from a Latin version, because Egypt belonged to the Greek diocese, and Latin was not understood there. Woide, who defended the Greek manuscripts in general, and the Codex Alexandrinus in particular, from the charge of having been corrupted from the Latin, discerned two hands in the New Testament.

Griesbach agreed with Woide and expanded on Michaelis' point of view. If this manuscript has been corrupted from a version, it is more reasonable to suspect the Coptic, the version of the country in which it was written. Between this manuscript and both the Coptic and Syriac versions there is a remarkable coincidence. According to Griesbach the manuscript follows three different editions: the Byzantine in the Gospels, the Western in the Acts and General epistles, and the Alexandrian in the Pauline epistles. Griesbach designated the codex by letter A.

Tregelles explained the origin of the Arabic inscription, on which Cyril's statement appears to rest, by remarking that the text of the New Testament in the manuscript begins with Matthew 25:6, this lesson (Matthew 25:1–13) being that appointed by the Greek Church for the festival of St. Thecla.

Importance
It was the first manuscript of great importance and antiquity of which any extensive use was made by textual critics, but the value of the codex was differently appreciated by different writers in the past. Wettstein created a modern system of catalogization of the New Testament manuscripts. Codex Alexandrinus received symbol A and opened the list of the NT uncial manuscripts. Wettstein announced in his Prolegomena ad Novi Testamenti Graeci (1730) that Codex A is the oldest and the best manuscript of the New Testament, and should be the basis in every reconstruction of the New Testament text. Codex Alexandrinus became a basis for criticizing the Textus Receptus (Wettstein, Woide, Griesbach).

See also

 Biblical manuscript
 List of New Testament uncials
 Textual criticism

Notes

References

Further reading

Text of the codex

Other works

External links

Images
 Volume 4 (the New Testament) on the British Library's Digitised Manuscripts website
 Volume 4 (the New Testament) at the CSNTM (facsimile of 1880s edition)

Articles
 Codex Alexandrinus: information, zoomable image British Library website
 

Greek New Testament uncials
Illuminated biblical manuscripts
5th-century biblical manuscripts
Septuagint manuscripts
Great uncial codices
British Library Royal manuscripts